The 2009 BMW Ljubljana Open was a professional tennis tournament played on outdoor red clay courts. It was the eighteenth edition of the tournament which was part of the 2009 ATP Challenger Tour. It took place in Ljubljana, Slovenia between 21 and 27 September 2009.

Singles main draw entrants

Seeds

 Rankings are as of 14 September 2009.

Other entrants
The following players received wildcards into the singles main draw:
  Rok Bonin
  Aljaž Bedene
  Janez Semrajc
  Mark Zakovšek

The following player received a Special Exempt into the singles main draw:
  Dušan Lojda

The following players received entry from the qualifying draw:
  Jonathan Eysseric
  Kornél Bardóczky
  Ádám Kellner
  Goran Tošić

Champions

Singles

 Paolo Lorenzi def.  Grega Žemlja, 1–6, 7–6(4), 6–2

Doubles

 Jamie Delgado /  Jamie Murray def.  Stéphane Robert /  Simone Vagnozzi, 6–3, 6–3

References
Site about Slovenian Tennis
ITF Search 
2009 Draws

BMW Ljubljana Open
Tennis tournaments in Slovenia
Clay court tennis tournaments
2009 in Slovenian tennis
BMW Ljubljana Open